A ghoul is an evil spirit from Arabian folklore.

Ghoul may also refer to:

In literature
 Ghoul (comics), a fictional character in Marvel Comics 
 Ra's al Ghul (also called "Ghoul" or "Ghul"), a fictional character in DC Comics
 Ghoul (novel), a 2007 horror novel by Brian Keene
 Ghoul, a 1987 novel by Michael Slade
 Tokyo Ghoul a manga series by Sui Ishida

In music
 Ghoul (band), American thrash metal band
 Ghul, stage name of British guitarist Charles Hedger

Onscreen

In film
The Ghoul (1933 film), a film starring Boris Karloff
The Ghoul (1975 film), starring Peter Cushing
The Ghouls, a 2003 American independent horror film
Ghoul (2015 film), a Czech horror film
The Ghoul (2016 film), a British thriller film

In television
Ghouls (Yu-Gi-Oh!), a group of fictional characters in the anime (and manga) series, also known as "Rare Hunters"
Preta Ghoul, a fictional character in the anime (and manga) series Black Cat
The Ghoul, a fictional race of creatures in the anime series Divergence Eve
The Ghoul, horror host Ron Sweed's character in The Ghoul Show
Tokyo Ghoul, an anime (and manga) on "the natural enemies of humans"
Ghoul (miniseries), an Indian horror Netflix miniseries

In games
Ghoul (Dungeons & Dragons), a creature in the Dungeons & Dragons roleplaying game
Ghoul (Fallout), a race of irradiated posthumans in the Fallout video game series
Ghouls (video game), an 8-bit platform game